Marc Sallés Esteve (born 6 May 1987) is a Spanish field hockey player who plays as a midfielder for Atlètic Terrassa and the Spanish national team. 

At the 2012 Summer Olympics, he competed for the national team in the men's tournament.

Personal life

Career
Salles is coached by national coach Daniel Martin. He played for Atletic de Terrassa, in Terrassa, Catalonia until 2009 and from 2011 until 2018. After playing one season for Club de Campo, he returned to Atlètic Terrassa for the 2019–20 season.

Marc Sallés winning goal against France in August 2011 at the 2011 EuroHockey Championship secured A division status for Spain in 2013.
At the 2012 Summer Olympics in London, he competed in the field hockey men's tournament but did not score. In August 2019, he was selected in the Spain squad for the 2019 EuroHockey Championship. They won the silver medal as they lost 5–0 to Belgium in the final. On 25 May 2021, he was selected in the squad for the 2021 EuroHockey Championship.

References

External links

1987 births
Living people
Sportspeople from Terrassa
Spanish male field hockey players
Male field hockey midfielders
Field hockey players at the 2012 Summer Olympics
2014 Men's Hockey World Cup players
Field hockey players at the 2016 Summer Olympics
2018 Men's Hockey World Cup players
Field hockey players at the 2020 Summer Olympics
Olympic field hockey players of Spain
Oranje Zwart players
Club de Campo Villa de Madrid players
Atlètic Terrassa players
Men's Hoofdklasse Hockey players
División de Honor de Hockey Hierba players
Expatriate field hockey players
Spanish expatriate sportspeople in the Netherlands